is a Japanese footballer currently playing as a midfielder for FC Tokyo.

Club career
Born in Muroran, Hokkaido, Matsuki followed in his older brother's footsteps by joining local side Muroran Osawa FC.

Matsuki trained with French Ligue 1 side Olympique Lyonnais in 2021. Following this trial, he returned to Japan to lift the 2021 All Japan High School Soccer Tournament for Aomori Yamada High School, scoring in both the semi-final and final.

Initially set to move to Europe to pursue a professional career, it was announced that Matsuki would sign for J1 League side FC Tokyo ahead of the 2022 season. Matsuki stated that a major influence on his decision to stay in Japan was current FC Tokyo player Yuto Nagatomo, who also started his career with Tokyo before moving to Europe.

Career statistics

Club
.

Notes

References

2003 births
Living people
Association football people from Hokkaido
Japanese footballers
Japan youth international footballers
Association football midfielders
J1 League players
FC Tokyo players